Sanjiaocheng Station is a metro station of Line 1 of the Fuzhou Metro. It is located on Fuxia Road, south of Chengmen Town Government in Cangshan District, Fuzhou, Fujian, China. It started operation on May 18, 2016.

Station layout

Exits

References 

Railway stations in China opened in 2016
Fuzhou Metro stations